Zable is a surname. Notable people with the surname include:

Arnold Zable (born 1947), Australian writer, novelist, and human rights activist
Walter J. Zable (1915–2012), American businessman, entrepreneur, and athlete

See also
Zable Stadium, sports venue in Williamsburg, Virginia